Linda Walsh (born 1958; née Grimshaw) is a British scientist who specializes in radiation epidemiology. She is an honorary visiting research fellow in the Medical Physics Department of the University of Zurich in Switzerland.

Walsh was born in Bolton, England in 1958, and attended Smithills Moor Grammar School. She studied at the Department of Physics of the University of Manchester, gaining a Bachelor of Science degree (1979), Master of Science (1980) and PhD (1985). In 2013, Walsh was awarded a higher doctorate (Doctor of Science) by the Medical Faculty of Manchester University.

Since 2000, her research has evaluated the risk of cancer and other medical conditions from exposure to ionising radiation (such as gamma-rays and X-rays), using applied statistical or quantitative methods. She served on the World Health Organization's expert panel that assessed radiation-related cancer risk after the nuclear accident in 2011 at the Fukushima power plant in Japan. She also developed epidemiological models for thyroid cancer risk associated with the 1986 accident at the Chernobyl nuclear power station. Other research has related to Japanese survivors of the World War II atomic bombs in the Life Span Study cohort, as well as German uranium miners at Wismut's mines.

References

1958 births
Living people
Alumni of the University of Manchester
People from Bolton
British women physicists
20th-century British physicists
20th-century British women scientists
21st-century British physicists
21st-century British women scientists